Anchor Cone is a mountain in western British Columbia, Canada, located on the south side of Lowe Inlet, Grenville Channel, and southwest of Kitimat. It lies in the Countess of Dufferin Range, a subrange of the Kitimat Ranges which in turn form part of the Coast Mountains.

References

Mountains of British Columbia under 1000 metres
Kitimat Ranges
Range 4 Coast Land District